Bräsen is a village and a former municipality in the district of Wittenberg in Saxony-Anhalt, Germany. Since 1 January 2010, it is part of the town Coswig.

Former municipalities in Saxony-Anhalt
Coswig, Saxony-Anhalt